The  is a dam in The Netherlands which connects Zuid-Beveland with Noord-Beveland, and separates the Oosterschelde from the Veerse Meer. A navigation lock in the dam permits shipping connections to Middelburg and Vlissingen, via the Veerse Meer and the Walcheren navigation channel.

The construction of the Zandkreekdam, together with the Veerse Gatdam in 1961, created the freshwater Veerse Meer (Veerse Lake). There are two bridges at the Zandkreekdam locks to permit vehicular traffic to pass over it at any time.

Johan van Veen's Three-Island Plan required that construction of the Zankreekdam and the Veerse Gatdam should be undertaken as early as possible in the Delta Works programme, to permit Dutch civil engineers and contractors to gain experience that would be necessary for more complicated Delta Works projects such as the Brouwersdam and Oosterscheldekering.

Feasibility, planning and design
Johan van Veen had been developing his Three Islands Plan since the 1930s, in which he considered land reclamation around the islands of Walcheren, Nord-Beveland and Zuid-Beveland and proposed the closure of two bodies of water: the Veerse Gat and the Zandkreek. In combination with the effects of the previously-constructed Sloedam, this would shorten the coastline from 52 kilometers to 2.5 kilometres and open up large areas of land to be reclaimed from the sea.

Van Veen recognised the need to close both bodies of water, with the Zandkreekdam acting as a secondary dam to make the works on the Veerse Gatdam easier and therefore being constructed first. Having made extensive studies, van Veen realised that the closure of the Veerse Gat alone would cause unacceptable tidal streams in the Zandkreek. It was also important that construction of the Veerse Gatdam did not lag too far behind the Zandkreekdam, as closing only the Zandkreek would dangerously increase the effects of storm surges in both the Veerse Gat and the Zandkreek.

The design was based on the use of caissons 6 metres high, 7.5 metres wide and 11 metres long to form a closure dam, along with the construction of a lock to permit navigation.

Construction

Construction began in the spring of 1957, with dredging undertaken to form a foundation trench 6.5 metres below Amsterdam Ordnance Datum (N.A.P.). Weak soils including soft clay and peat were removed and replaced with approximately 160,000 cubic metres of sand, and excavation depths up to 14 metres below N.A.P. were realised. Unit caissons were used to construct the dam, with the maximum depth of the closing hole being 5m below N.A.P. 

On 3 May 1960, a pair of caissons were sunk into the final gap and the dam was then completed to a height of 8.25m above N.A.P. The navigation lock, 140 metres long and 20 metres wide, was ready for shipping in the spring of 1960.

See also 
 Delta Works
 Flood control in the Netherlands
 Rijkswaterstaat
 Johan van Veen

References

External links
Information on the Zandkreekdam from the official Watersnoodmuseum website
 

Delta Works
Dams completed in 1960
Dams in Zeeland
Noord-Beveland
Zuid-Beveland
Transport in Goes